Alon Yavnai (born 1969) is an Israel-born jazz pianist.

Biography
Born in Israel, Yavnai began playing piano at the age of four. He has accompanied singers since the age of thirteen. He graduated from the Thelma Yellin High School for Arts, Givatayim Conservatory, both in Israel, and studied at Berklee College of Music in Boston, Massachusett. He won first place in the Great American Jazz Piano Competition. He taught at the Sitka Fine Arts Camp.

Yavnai leads a trio and has worked in a duo with Paquito D'Rivera and in a trio with Mark Summer. He has also worked with Leny Andrade, Regina Carter, Jim Chapin, Ravi Coltrane, George Garzone, Louis Hayes, Freddie Hubbard, Joe Lovano, Romero Lubambo, Bob Moses New York Voices, Rosa Passos, Rufus Reid, Claudio Roditi, and Nancy Wilson.

In 2008, Yavnai won a Grammy Award as a part of the Paquito D'Rivera Quintet for Best Latin Jazz Album (Funk Tango). Yavnai wrote the title track. In May 2008, Yavnai released his album Travel Notes which features solo pieces as well as trio pieces (with Omer Avital on bass and Jamey Haddad on percussion).

Discography

As leader/co-leader

As sideman
 Caribbean Jazz Project, Mosaic (Concord Picante, 2006)
 Paquito D'Rivera, Jazz Chamber Trio (Chesky, 2005)
 Paquito D'Rivera, Funk Tango (Sunnyside/Paquito, 2007)
 Nancy Wilson, Turned to Blue  (MCG Jazz, 2006)

References

External links
Official site
Alon Yavnai at ObliqSound
[ Alon Yavnai Discography] at allmusic

1969 births
Living people
Berklee College of Music alumni
Jazz composers
Israeli jazz pianists
21st-century pianists